The 9th constituency of Val-de-Marne is a French legislative constituency in the Val-de-Marne département.

Description

The 9th constituency of Val-de-Marne lies in the centre of the department including the suburbs of Alfortville and Vitry-sur-Seine.

Since its creation in 1988 the constituency has returned left wing deputies at every election. The former deputy René Rouquet first won the seat in 1988 but subsequently lost it to the Communist candidate in 1993 before reclaiming in 1997. He retired in 2017, letting Luc Carvounas, the mayor of Alfortville, be the socialist candidate and win the race in a difficult national context for the party.

Historic Representation

Election results

2022

 
 
 
 
 
 
 
 
|-
| colspan="8" bgcolor="#E9E9E9"|
|-

2020 by-election

2017

 
 
 
 
 
 
|-
| colspan="8" bgcolor="#E9E9E9"|
|-

2012

 
 
 
 
 
 
|-
| colspan="8" bgcolor="#E9E9E9"|
|-

2007

 
 
 
 
 
 
 
|-
| colspan="8" bgcolor="#E9E9E9"|
|-

2002

 
 
 
 
|-
| colspan="8" bgcolor="#E9E9E9"|
|-

1997

 
 
 
 
 
 
 
|-
| colspan="8" bgcolor="#E9E9E9"|
|-
 
 

 
 
 
 

* Withdrew before the 2nd round

Sources
Official results of French elections from 2002: "Résultats électoraux officiels en France" (in French).

9